William Hendricks Jr. (1809–1850) was born in Westmoreland County, Pennsylvania, January 7, 1809. He was the son of future Governor William Hendricks.

Hendricks was a member of Indiana House of Representatives, 1846 through 1847 and a member of Indiana Senate from 1848 to 1850. He died in Madison, Indiana on July 19, 1850.

References

1809 births
1850 deaths
People from Westmoreland County, Pennsylvania
American Presbyterians
Members of the Indiana House of Representatives
Indiana state senators
19th-century American politicians